Vladimir Igorevich Malakhov (born August 30, 1968) is a Russian former professional ice hockey player of the National Hockey League (NHL). He has also played in the Russian Super League. Currently, Malakhov is a Player Development coach for the New York Islanders.

Malakhov was drafted by the New York Islanders in the 1989 NHL Entry Draft, tenth round, 191st overall. He has played for Spartak Moscow, CSKA Moscow, New York Islanders, Montreal Canadiens, New Jersey Devils (winning the Stanley Cup in 2000), New York Rangers and the Philadelphia Flyers.

Transactions
June 17, 1989 – New York Islanders' 10th round draft choice (191st overall) in the 1989 NHL Entry Draft.
April 5, 1995 – Traded by the New York Islanders, along with Pierre Turgeon to the Montreal Canadiens in exchange for Craig Darby, Kirk Muller and Mathieu Schneider.
March 1, 2000 – Traded by the Montreal Canadiens to the New Jersey Devils in exchange for Sheldon Souray, Josh Dewolf and New Jersey's 2001 2nd round draft choice.
July 10, 2000 – Signed as a free agent with the New York Rangers
March 8, 2004 – Traded by the New York Rangers to the Philadelphia Flyers in exchange for Rick Kozak and Philadelphia's 2005 2nd round draft choice.
August 5, 2005 – Signed as a free agent with the New Jersey Devils.
October 1, 2006 – Traded by the New Jersey Devils, along with a conditional 1st round draft choice, to the San Jose Sharks in exchange for Alexander Korolyuk and Jim Fahey.

Controversies 
In 1999, Donald Trump’s lawyer, Michael Cohen, was given a check for $350,000 from Malakhov to be given as a loan to his friend, Yulia Fomina. The friend, however, swore in an affidavit that she never received the money and never even knew the check had been written until it was discovered years later in a Florida lawsuit.

During the 1999-2000 NHL season, Malakhov came under fire from Canadiens head coach Alain Vigneault, after it was revealed that he went on a ski trip to a resort in Mont-Tremblant, Quebec with his family during the All-Star break. This proved to be controversial with team management, as he hadn't played with the team all season, as he was recovering from a knee injury. As he was in breach of his contract, Malakhov was suspended by the Canadiens as a result.

Malakhov further angered Canadiens fans and coaches after he returned to the lineup following his suspension, after he responded to jeers by waving obscene gestures at fans which prompted louder jeers. When asked about it, Malakhov lashed out at the team's fans for his reaction. Malakhov, who was slated to become an unrestricted free agent at the end of the season, was traded to the New Jersey Devils weeks later.

On December 19, 2005, reports surfaced that Malakhov, who joined the Devils for the second time, had unexpectedly retired from the NHL. However, shortly after the story broke, his agent claimed that Malakhov had not retired and was taking a leave of absence "to deal with some internal, personal and medical issues." This claim was disputed by Lou Lamoriello, Devils CEO, president, general manager, and interim head coach. Lamoriello rejected the request for a leave of absence and treated Malakhov's absence as a retirement. This marked the end of Malakhov's pro career.

Achievements 
 Olympic Bronze Medal (2002)
 1999–2000 Stanley Cup (New Jersey)
 NHL All-Rookie Team (1993)
 Olympic Gold Medal (1992)

Career statistics

Regular season and playoffs

International

References

External links 

 

1968 births
Living people
Battle of the Blades participants
Capital District Islanders players
HC CSKA Moscow players
HC Spartak Moscow players
Ice hockey players at the 1992 Winter Olympics
Ice hockey players at the 2002 Winter Olympics
Montreal Canadiens players
New Jersey Devils players
New York Islanders draft picks
New York Islanders players
New York Rangers players
Olympic bronze medalists for Russia
Olympic gold medalists for the Unified Team
Olympic ice hockey players of Russia
Olympic ice hockey players of the Unified Team
Sportspeople from Yekaterinburg
Philadelphia Flyers players
Russian ice hockey defencemen
Soviet ice hockey defencemen
Stanley Cup champions
Triple Gold Club
Olympic medalists in ice hockey
Medalists at the 2002 Winter Olympics
Medalists at the 1992 Winter Olympics
Russian expatriate sportspeople in the United States
Russian expatriate sportspeople in Canada
Russian expatriate ice hockey people
Expatriate ice hockey players in the United States
Expatriate ice hockey players in Canada